Konstantinos Iliadis (born 14 May 1960) is a Cypriot wrestler. He competed in the men's freestyle 74 kg at the 1992 Summer Olympics.

References

External links
 

1960 births
Living people
Cypriot male sport wrestlers
Olympic wrestlers of Cyprus
Wrestlers at the 1992 Summer Olympics
Place of birth missing (living people)